The III Grote Prijs van Danske (or 3rd Danish Grand Prix) was held on 25–26 August 1962,  at the Roskilde Ring circuit, Roskilde, Denmark. The race was a non-Championship Formula One race. The race was run over three heats, one of 20 laps and two of 30 laps, and was won overall by Jack Brabham, who won all three heats in his Lotus 24. This race was the first Formula One event for successful Rhodesian motorcycle rider Gary Hocking, who finished 4th overall.

This was the second and last Formula One event to be held at the Roskildering, which was eventually closed in 1969.

Race summary
The first heat saw Brabham win from American Masten Gregory, with Innes Ireland in third. The main incident was an accident involving the Lotus 18 of Jay Chamberlain. Brabham also took the second heat, with Ireland in second this time, and John Surtees in third, with Roy Salvadori crashing out this time. Chamberlain returned for the third and final heat, and the first three home in the first heat crossed the line in the same order in the third heat, with a comfortable overall win for Brabham, who also drove the fastest lap.

Overall results

References

External links
Full results details at formula2.net

Danish Grand Prix
Danish Grand Prix
Danish Grand Prix, 1962
1962 in Danish motorsport